Raggett is a surname. Notable people with the surname include:

 Dave Raggett (born 1955), English computer specialist
 Jonathan Raggett (born 1992), English actor
 Matthew Raggett (born 1972), educator, writer, and school headmaster
 Sean Raggett (born 1994), English footballer